Yockleton is a village in Shropshire, England.

Yockleton is west of the county town of Shrewsbury, on the B4386 road to Montgomery and near the River Severn. The population as taken at the 2011 census can be found under Westbury.

Yockleton is near to Ford (to its north) and Westbury (to its west), and lies in the Westbury civil parish; the hamlets of Edge and Farley lie due south of the village, and Nox is to the east.

Amenities
There is one local pub, the Yockleton Arms (formerly the Pink Elephant), several miles west on the B4386, a 19th-century village church (C of E) dedicated to the Holy Trinity, and a village hall, as well as an old people's home called Yockleton Grange in the old Vicarage. There is a Motte and Bailey in a field not far from the church.

Previously Yockleton had a school, a garage, a post office and a pub in the heart of the village. These have closed as the village has developed into a commuter village for Shrewsbury. 

Previously served by Yockleton railway station on the Cambrian Line. The station closed in 1960.

Notable people
Lily Chitty (1893-1979), archaeologist, lived at Yockleton when her father was Rector there between 1920-1938.
General Sir Geoffrey Musson (1910-2008), senior British Army officer, was born here.

See also
Listed buildings in Westbury, Shropshire

References

External links

Villages in Shropshire